Hopkins Observatory  is an astronomical observatory owned and operated by Williams College in Williamstown, Massachusetts (USA).  Constructed in 1838 by Albert Hopkins, the college claims that it is the oldest observatory in the United States.

The observatory dates to 1834 when Prof. Albert Hopkins traveled to England to obtain astronomical equipment. His students constructed the observatory 1836-1838 in the center of the quad. It was moved once in 1908 and again to its present location in 1961, where it now serves as a planetarium. Today's building still contains the original transit, regulator with mercury-compensated pendulum, and rule.

The museum's second director, Truman Henry Safford, was a calculating prodigy. In 1852 the firm of Alvan Clark (Cambridge, Massachusetts) built a 7" refracting telescope, which was restored for the observatory's sesquicentennial. In 1963 the planetarium projector was installed and named in memory of Willis Milham, professor of astronomy 1901-1942. The observatory's side rooms have become the Mehlin Museum of Astronomy in memory of Theodore Mehlin, professor of astronomy 1942-1971.

See also 
List of astronomical observatories

References

External links
Hopkins Observatory Clear Sky Clock Forecasts of observing conditions.

Williams College
Astronomical observatories in Massachusetts
Buildings and structures in Berkshire County, Massachusetts
History of Berkshire County, Massachusetts
Tourist attractions in Berkshire County, Massachusetts
Williamstown, Massachusetts
1838 establishments in Massachusetts